List of the colonial governors of French Ivory Coast−Côte d'Ivoire,  a colony in former French West Africa.

Colonial governors
Dates in italics indicate de facto continuation of office.

See also

For continuation after independence, see: Heads of state of Côte d'Ivoire

 
.Ivory Coast
Ivory Coast
Colonial heads
Colonial governors
History of Ivory Coast